Werner of Oberwesel (also known as Werner of Bacharach or Werner of Womrath; 1271 – 1287) was a 16-year-old boy whose unexplained death was blamed on Jews, leading to revenge killings of Jews across Europe. He was venerated as a Christian saint, and his memorial day was 19 April.

Saint Werner's Chapel in Oberwesel on the Rhine was established in 1289 and became a popular pilgrimage site. His veneration prompted other allegations against Jews, such as Host desecration and ritual murder.

Background
Born in 1271 in Womrath, Hunsrück, Werner came from a poor background. On Maundy Thursday 1287, his body was found near Bacharach. Certain Christians blamed his murder on the Jews, claiming that they had used his blood for the Jewish ritual of Passover (the blood libel against Jews). Similar anti-Jewish legends were widely circulated in the Middle Ages.

The alleged murder was followed by a wave of pogroms against the Jewish community. Violence spread from the Middle Rhine to the Moselle and the Lower Rhine region. The Jewish community turned to King Rudolf I, who was convinced the accusations were groundless. He fined the murderers of Jews and ordered the burning of the corpse of Werner to prevent any further veneration.

Veneration

The royal instructions to burn Werner's body, to prevent any further veneration, were not followed. Werner was buried on 30 April 1287 and alleged miracles began to be reported as the veneration spread as a martyr cult. The Cunibert Chapel in Bacharach was expanded beginning in 1289 to become the present Saint Werner's Chapel. The planned expansion of the chapel into a large church remained unfinished after 1338. A further construction also failed owing to the decline of the veneration of martyrs and shrinking revenue to the church from pilgrims.

The 1338 Latin legend alleges the Jews hung Werner by his feet. Then they had him thrown into the Rhine. At the point in Bacharach where the body was supposedly washed ashore, Saint Werner's Chapel was built. A second sanctuary was built in the Chapel of the Holy Spirit Hospital of Oberwesel, 7 kilometers downstream.

Count Palatine Ludwig III aspired to a revival of the cult. Attempts towards Canonisation were made 1426-1429 , the chapel was finally completed. After 1548 some of the relics were transferred to Besançon, spreading the Werner mythology.

Although the chapel was destroyed in the 17th century, Werner was venerated in the Diocese of Trier until 1963.

In iconography, Werner is depicted with a sickle as well as a shovel and pan. He has been acknowledged as a patron saint of winemakers.

Contemporary attitudes

In 1963, Werner was removed from the calendar of the Diocese of Trier, but "Saint Werner of Oberwesel" still appears in German directories of saints. The chapel dedicated to him alongside the town wall facing the Rhine, which had been in ruins, was later renovated, and a plaque added, with a quotation from Pope John XXIII, recognizing the brotherhood of Christians and Jews, and asking for forgiveness for "the curse that we unrightfully affixed to the Jews’ name."

See also
Blood Libel
The Prioress's Tale
Andreas Oxner
Saint Gabriel of Białystok
Harold of Gloucester
Little Saint Hugh of Lincoln
Robert of Bury
Simon of Trent
William of Norwich

References 

 
 Jeffrey L. Sammons: Heinrich Heine: A Modern Biography:: (Princeton University Press, 1979), pages 89 to 96 — Heinrich Heine: Der Rabbi von Bacherach (= "The Rabbi of Bacharach", unfinished historical novel, 1840).
 Rheinfriede Gleisner: Nach Juden-Pogromen kam Heiligen-Legende; in: Hunsrücker Zeitung, 18. April 1987, S. 27.
 
 Gerd Hergen Lübben: Der Textfund zu Bacherach; in: Die Brücke – Forum für antirassistische Politik und Kultur, Heft 140, 2/2006 (Saarbrücken), S. 126–128; and in: Gerd Hergen Lübben, VERSIONEN III (»Fund zu Bacherach«), E-Book 2014, .
 Gerd Mentgen: Die Ritualmordaffäre um den „Guten Werner“ von Oberwesel und ihre Folgen; in: Jahrbuch für Westdeutsche Landesgeschichte 21 (1995), S. 159–198.
 Werner Wendling: Der „gute Werner“ hat ausgedient; in: Rhein-Hunsrück-Zeitung, 4. Juli 2006, S. 17.
 Thomas Wetzstein: Vom „Volksheiligen“ zum „Fürstenheiligen“. Die Wiederbelebung des Wernerkults im 15. Jahrhundert; in: Archiv für mittelrheinische Kirchengeschichte 51 (1999), S. 11–68.
 Daniela Wolf: Ritualmordaffäre und Kultgenese. Der „gute Werner von Oberwesel“; Bacharach: Bauverein Wernerkapelle Bacharach, 2002;  .
 Eintrag im Ökumenischen Heiligenlexikon

Further reading
 Henri de Grèzes, Saint Vernier (Verny, Werner, Garnier), martyr, patron des vignerons en Auvergne, en Bourgogne et en Franche-Comté, sa vie, son martyre et son culte'' (1889)

External links 
http://www.santiebeati.it/dettaglio/90238
https://religionnews.com/2018/11/09/kristallnacht-pittsburgh/

1271 births
1287 deaths
13th-century German people
Roman Catholic child saints
German Roman Catholic saints
Folk saints
Incidents of violence against boys
Murdered German children
Antisemitism in Germany
Medieval anti-Jewish pogroms
Blood libel
Christian anti-Judaism in the Middle Ages
People from Rhein-Hunsrück-Kreis
People from Oberwesel